The 1975 World Table Tennis Championships men's singles was the 33rd edition of the men's singles championship. 

István Jónyer defeated Antun Stipančić in the final, winning three sets to two to secure the title.

Results

See also
List of World Table Tennis Championships medalists

References

-